Canary in a Cat House is a collection of twelve short stories by American writer Kurt Vonnegut, published in 1961.  Eleven of the twelve appear in the later collection Welcome to the Monkey House, with "Hal Irwin's Magic Lamp" being omitted. In a later collection of short stories, Bagombo Snuff Box, there is a story with that title although it is a different version.

Contents
 "Report on the Barnhouse Effect" (Collier's, 11 February 1950)
 "All The King's Horses" (Collier's, 10 February 1951)
 "D.P."
 "The Manned Missiles"
 "The Euphio Question" (Collier's, 12 May 1951)
 "More Stately Mansions"
 "The Foster Portfolio"
 "Deer in the Works"
 "Hal Irwin's Magic Lamp"
 "Tom Edison's Shaggy Dog"
 "Unready to Wear" (Galaxy Science Fiction, April 1953)
 "Tomorrow and Tomorrow and Tomorrow" (1953)

References

1961 short story collections
Gold Medal Books books
Postmodern books
Short story collections by Kurt Vonnegut